Jasmyn Grace Banks (born 20 August 1990) is an English actress. She is known for her role as Alice Branning in the BBC soap opera EastEnders.

Career
Banks trained at the Young Persons Theatre Company (RAaW London) and the Italia Conti Academy of Theatre Arts. She appeared in various stage productions between 2005 and 2009, including The Wizard of Oz, Twelfth Night, 1963 They had a Dream and The Wind in the Willows. Banks first appeared on television in 2006. in an episode of the children's series My Parents Are Aliens. In 2011, Banks made guest appearances in two BBC productions for television: She played the role of Belinda Stuart in an episode of the daytime soap opera Doctors, and she played the role of Lauren in an episode of the sitcom Life of Riley entitled "Absent Friends".

In April 2012, Banks was cast as Alice Branning, daughter of established character Derek Branning, in the BBC soap opera EastEnders; she was working in a bar when she received news of her casting. Banks said she was a long-time fan of EastEnders and that she was "thrilled" to be joining the soap opera as part of the Branning family. Banks made her first appearance as Alice in an episode broadcast on 10 May 2012. Alice's character departed from the show on 24 December 2013, after being falsely charged for the murder of her lover, Michael Moon. Banks then toured with the theatre production One Man, Two Guvnors from 2014 until 2015.

Filmography

Television

Stage

Awards and nominations

References

External links
 

1990 births
Living people
English television actresses
English stage actresses
English soap opera actresses
Actresses from London
People from Hendon
Alumni of the Italia Conti Academy of Theatre Arts